Orearville is an unincorporated community in Saline County, in the U.S. state of Missouri.

History
A post office called Orearville was established in 1875, and remained in operation until 1903. The community has the name of the local Orear family.

References

Unincorporated communities in Saline County, Missouri
Unincorporated communities in Missouri